The Bornean slow loris (Nycticebus borneanus) is a strepsirrhine primate and a species of slow loris that is native to Borneo in Indonesia.

Bornean slow loris may also refer to other slow lorises of Borneo that once shared that common name, including:

 Nycticebus bancanus, the Bangka slow loris
 Nycticebus kayan, the Kayan River slow loris
 Nycticebus menagensis, the Philippine slow loris

Animal common name disambiguation pages